Platynereis is a genus of marine annelid worms.

The species Platynereis dumerilii is used in development biology to study development (embryogenesis), in particular because their embryos are largely transparent, and thus easy to follow. Apical organs such as this one are photosensitive which is a key component in their formation. They also have a common ancestor with cnidarians and bilaterians.

Species 

 Platynereis abnormis
 Platynereis antipoda
 Platynereis arafurensis
 Platynereis australis
 Platynereis bengalensis
 Platynereis bicanaliculata
 Platynereis calodonta
 Platynereis cebuensis
 Platynereis coccinea
 Platynereis cristatus
 Platynereis dumerilii
 Platynereis festiva
 Platynereis fuscorubida
 Platynereis hugonis
 Platynereis hutchingsae
 Platynereis insolita
 Platynereis karaka
 Platynereis kau
 Platynereis magalhaensis
 Platynereis mahanga
 Platynereis massiliensis
 Platynereis megalops
 Platynereis mucronata
 Platynereis nadiae
 Platynereis pallida
 Platynereis patagonica
 Platynereis polyscalma
 Platynereis pulchella
 Platynereis sinica
 Platynereis tongatabuensis
 Platynereis uniseris

References

Polychaete genera
Phyllodocida